Liolaemus pictus, the painted tree iguana, is a species of lizard in the family Iguanidae. It is found in Chile and Argentina.

References

External links 
 Eco Registros: Liolaemus pictus

pictus
Lizards of South America
Reptiles of Argentina
Reptiles of Chile
Reptiles described in 1837
Taxa named by André Marie Constant Duméril
Taxa named by Gabriel Bibron